Nicolás Ruíz is a town and one of the 119 municipalities of Chiapas, in southern Mexico.

As of 2010, the municipality had a total population of 4,317, up from 3,135 as of 2005. It covers an area of 137 km². Other than the town of Nicolás Ruíz, the municipality had 2 localities, neither of which had a population over 1,000.

The settlement was originally known as San Diego de la Reforma; it acquired its present name on 14 February 1934 to honor 19th-century Governor of Chiapas Nicolás Ruiz.

References

Municipalities of Chiapas